Alain Chautems is research associate at the Geneva "Conservatoire et Jardin botaniques de la Ville de Genève, Switzerland. He specialized in some of the most diverse Gesneriaceae of Brazil (the Nematanthus/Codonanthe and Sinningia/Vanhouttea/Paliavana genera complexes, respectively). Until 2016, he was researcher and curator at the Conservatory and Botanical Garden of the City of Geneva.

Selected publications
 Arzolla, F.A.R.D.P., Paula, G.C.R., Chautems, A. & Shepherd, G. J. (2007). O primeiro registro de Sinningia gigantifolia Chautems (Gesneriaceae) no estado de São Paulo - SP (Nota científica). Biota Neotropica 7(3): 373-377 (publication online). www.biotaneotropica.org.br
 Chautems, A. (1984) Nematanthus australis Chautems sp.nova (Gesneriaceae): une nouvelle espèce du sud du Brésil. Candollea 39: 287–295.
 Chautems, A. (1984). Révision taxonomique d'un genre de Gesneriaceae endémique du Brésil: Nematanthus Schrader. Candollea 39: 297–300.
 Chautems, A. (1988). Révision taxonomique et possibilités d'hybridations de Nematanthus Schrader (Gesneriaceae), genre endémique de la forêt côtière brésilienne. Dissertationes Botanicae 112, 226 pp.
 Chautems, A. (1990). Revisão taxonômica de Sinningia Nees: primeiros resultados. Resumos, 31° Congresso Nacional de Botânica (SBB), Fortaleza: 47.
 Chautems, A. (1990). Taxonomic revision of Sinningia Nees: nomenclatural changes and new synonymies. Candollea 45(1): 381–388.
 Chautems, A. (1991). Taxonomic revision of Sinningia Nees II: new species from Brazil. Candollea 46: 411–425.
 Chautems, A. (1995). Taxonomic revision of Sinningia Nees (Gesneriaceae) III: new species from Brazil and new combinations. Gesneriana 1: 8-14 (1995).
 Chautems, A. (1997). New Gesneriaceae from São Paulo, Brazil. Candollea 52: 159-169 (1997).
 Chautems, A. (1999). Gesneriaceae. In: Ribeiro, J. L. S. ...[et al.] (eds.), Flora da Reserva Ducke, INPA-DFID, Manaus, Brazil: 602–605.
 Chautems, A. (2000). Gesneriaceae. In: Mendonça, M. P. & L. V. Lins (eds.), Lista vermelha das espécies ameaçadas de extinção da flora de Minas Gerais, Fundação Biodiversitas ed.
 Chautems, A. (2002). New Gesneriaceae from Minas Gerais, Brazil, Candollea 56: 261–279.
 Chautems, A. (2004), Flora de Grão Mogol – Gesneriaceae. Boletim de Botânica da Universidade de São Paulo 22(2): 141–142.
 Chautems, A. (2007). Gesneriaceae. In: Simonelli, M. & Fraga, C. N. (Org.). Espécies da Flora Ameaçadas de Extinção no Estado do Espírito Santo. IPEMA, Vitória, 144 pp.
 Chautems, A., Araujo, A. O. & M. Peixoto (2010). A new genus from Brazil: Chautemsia calcicola. Gesneriads 60 (3): 15–19.
 Chautems, A., G. S. Baracho & J. A. Siqueira Filho (2000). A new species of Sinningia (Gesneriaceae) from northeastern Brazil, Brittonia 52: 49–53.
 Chautems, A.(1984). Revisão taxonômica do gênero Nematanthus (Gesneriaceae). Programa e Resumos, 35° Congresso Nacional de Botânica, Sociedade Brasileira de Botânica (SBB), Manaus: 173.
 Leoni, L. S. & A. Chautems (2004). Flora Fanerogâmica do Parque Nacional do Caparaó: Gesneriaceae. Pabstia 15(3): 1-11.
 Lopes, T. C. C., Andreata, R. H. P. & Chautems, A. (2007). Distribuição e conservação do gênero Besleria L. (Gesneriaceae) no Brasil: dados preliminares (Nota científica). Revista Brasileira de Biociências (Porto Alegre) 5 supl. 2: 876–878.
 Perret, M., A. Chautems, M. Peixoto, R. Spichiger, & V. Savolainen (2001). Nectar sugar composition in relation to pollination syndromes in Sinningieae (Gesneriaceae). Annals of Botany 87: 267–273.
 Perret, M., A. Chautems, R. Spichiger, G. Kite & V. Savolainen (2003). Systematics and evolution of tribe Sinningieae (Gesneriaceae): evidence from phylogenetic analyses of six plastid DNA regions and nuclear ncpGS. American Journal of Botany 90(3): 445–460.
 Perret, M., Chautems, A. & Spichiger, R. (2006). Dispersal-Vicariance Analyses in the Tribe Sinningieae (Gesneriaceae): A Clue to Understanding Biogeographical History of the Brazilian Atlantic Forest. Annals of the Missouri Botanical Garden 93: 340–358.
 Perret, M., Chautems, A., Spichiger, R., Barraclough, T. & V. Savolainen (2007). Geographic Pattern of Speciation and Floral Diversification in the Neotropics: the Tribe Sinningieae (Gesneriaceae) as a Case Study. Evolution 61: 1641–1660.
 Rossini, J. & Chautems, A. (2007). Codonanthe gibbosa Rossini & Chautems, a new species of Gesneriaceae from the State of Espírito Santo, Brazil. Candollea 62: 215–220.

References

21st-century Swiss botanists
Living people
Scientists from Geneva
Year of birth missing (living people)